The white-lipped mud turtle (Kinosternon leucostomum) is a species of mud turtle in the family Kinosternidae. The species is endemic to Central America and northwestern South America.

Geographic range
Kinosternon leucostomum is found in Mexico, Belize, Costa Rica, Guatemala, Honduras, Nicaragua, Panama, Colombia, Ecuador, and Peru.

Subspecies
Northern white-lipped mud turtle – K. l. leucostomum 
Southern white-lipped mud turtle – K. l. postinguinale 

Nota bene: A trinomial authority in parentheses indicates that the subspecies was originally described in a genus other than Kinosternon.

Etymology
The synonym, Cinosternon spurrelli , which is a synonym of Kinosternon leucostomum postinguinale, was named in honor of British zoologist Herbert George Flaxman Spurrell.

References

Further reading
Boulenger GA (1889). Catalogue of the Chelonians, Rhynchocephalians, and Crocodiles in the British Museum (Natural History). New Edition. London: Trustees of the British Museum (Natural History). (Taylor and Francis, printers). x + 311 pp. + Plates I-III. (Cinosternon leucostomum, pp. 42–43).
Duméril AMC, Bibron G (1851).  "Cinosternon leucostomum ".  In: Duméril AMC, Duméril A[HA] (1851). Catalogue Methodique de la Collection des Reptiles. Paris: Museum d’Histoire Naturelle de Paris / Gide & Baudry. 224 pp. (Cinosternon leucostomum, new species, p. 17). (in French)..

Kinosternon
Turtles of North America
Turtles of South America
Reptiles of Mexico
Reptiles of Central America
Reptiles of Belize
Reptiles of Costa Rica
Reptiles of Guatemala
Reptiles of Honduras
Reptiles of Nicaragua
Reptiles of Panama
Reptiles of Colombia
Reptiles of Ecuador
Reptiles of Peru
Reptiles described in 1851
Taxa named by André Marie Constant Duméril
Taxa named by Gabriel Bibron